Deplanche's shiny skink (Sigaloseps deplanchei) is a species of lizard in the family Scincidae. The species is endemic to New Caledonia.

Etymology
The specific name, deplanchei, is in honor of French naval surgeon Émile Deplanche.

Geographic range
S. deplanchei is found in South Province, New Caledonia.

Habitat

Description

Reproduction
The mode of reproduction of S. deplanchei is unknown.

References

Further reading
Bavay A (1869). "Catalogue des Reptiles de la Nouvelle-Calédonie et description d'espèces nouvelles ". Mémoires de la Société Linnéenne de Normandie 15: 1–37. (Lygosoma deplanchei, new species, p. 23). (in French).
Sadlier RA (1987). "A review of the scincid lizards of New Caledonia". Records of the Australian Museum 39 (1): 1–66. (Sigaloseps deplanchei, new combination).
Sadlier RA, Bauer AM (1999). "The scincid lizard genus Sigaloseps (Reptilia: Scincidae) from New Caledonia in the Southwest Pacific: description of a new species and review of the biology, distribution and morphology of Sigaloseps deplanchei (Bavay)". Rec. Australian Mus. 51 (1): 83–91.

Sigaloseps
Reptiles described in 1869
Skinks of New Caledonia
Endemic fauna of New Caledonia
Taxa named by Arthur René Jean Baptiste Bavay